Wizard Island is a volcanic cinder cone which forms an island at the west end of Crater Lake in Crater Lake National Park, Oregon.

The crater was named the "Witches Cauldron" by William Gladstone Steel in 1885, who also gave Wizard Island its name at the same time.

Formation 

Wizard Island was created after Mount Mazama, a large complex volcano, erupted violently approximately 7,700 years ago, forming its caldera which now contains Crater Lake.

Another large cinder cone, Merriam Cone, is in the northeast part of the lake. Its surface features and lack of a crater indicate that Merriam Cone formed under water.

Access 

Current public access to Wizard Island is available only during the summer months when boat tours on Crater Lake are in operation.  The tours depart from Cleetwood Cove at the north end of the lake, and circle the lake in the counterclockwise direction, stopping at a dock at Governors Bay on the south side of Wizard Island.

Passengers on boat trips early in the day may choose to disembark on the island, but must be prepared to spend the entire day on the island if subsequent boats are too full to take on additional passengers.  Those on late afternoon boat trips are not permitted to disembark.  A final boat is dispatched at the end of each day to pick up any stragglers since overnight camping is not permitted on the island.

Two hiking trails are available on Wizard Island, one of which switchbacks up the flanks of the cone and circles the crater on top while the other trail meanders from the dock towards the western end of the island.

Notes

References

External links 

 USGS Crater Lake Data Clearinghouse 
 USGS Crater Lake Bathymetry Images
 USGS: Crater Lake, OR: Wizard Island Perspective View
 USGS: Crater Lake, OR: Merriam Cone Perspective View
 Crater Lake National Park (National Park Service)
 Crater Lake Boat Tours (NPS concessionaire site)

Cascade Range
Cascade Volcanoes
Cinder cones of the United States
Volcanoes of Oregon
Volcanoes of Klamath County, Oregon
Subduction volcanoes
Lake islands of Oregon
Crater Lake National Park
Uninhabited islands of Oregon
Volcanic islands
Crater Lake